Professor is a 1972 Indian Malayalam-language film, directed and produced by P. Subramaniam. The film stars Sharada, Gemini Ganesan, Thikkurissy Sukumaran Nair and Baby Rajashree. The film had musical score by G. Devarajan.

Cast

Gemini Ganesan as Professor Mangalassery
Sharada as Lakshmi
Vijayasree as Mayadevi
Thikkurissy Sukumaran Nair as Principal
Alummoodan as Raju Malathinkal
Baby Rajashree as Latha
Baby Sumathi as Rema
Bahadoor as Carnival Magician
Kottarakkara Sreedharan Nair as Vasumathi's Father
K. V. Shanthi as Vasumathi
Kundara Bhasi
T. K. Balachandran as Film Producer
K. P. A. C. Sunny as Hostel Warden

Soundtrack
The music was composed by G. Devarajan and the lyrics were written by Vayalar Ramavarma.

References

External links
 

1972 films
1970s Malayalam-language films
Films directed by P. Subramaniam